The Battle of Rumaila, also known as the Battle of the Causeway or the Battle of the Junkyard, was a controversial attack that took place on March 2, 1991, two days after President Bush declared a ceasefire, near the Rumaila oil field in the Euphrates Valley of southern Iraq, when the U.S. Army forces, mostly the 24th Infantry Division under Major General Barry McCaffrey engaged and nearly annihilated a large column of withdrawing Iraqi Republican Guard armored forces during the immediate aftermath of the Gulf War.

Prior actions to Rumaila
On 26 February, the 24th Infantry Division advanced through the valley and captured Iraqi airfields at the Battle for Jalibah Airfield and Tallil. While moving through Objective Gold, a large logistics center between Tallil on the west and Jalibah airfield on the east, the 24th Infantry Division found 1,700 bunkers full of munitions, weapons, petroleum and other war stocks. At the airfields, it encountered entrenched resistance from the Iraqi 37th and 49th Infantry Divisions, as well as the 6th Nebuchadnezzar Mechanised Division of the Iraqi Republican Guard. Despite some of the most fierce resistance of the war, the 24th Infantry Division destroyed the Iraqi formations and captured the two airfields the next day. The 24th then moved east with VII Corps and engaged several Iraqi Republican Guard divisions. The 24th Infantry Division's Task Force Tusker attacked entrenched Iraqi forces on 26 February 1991 to seize battle position 143, effectively severing the Iraqi Euphrates River Valley line of communication to the Kuwait Theater of operation and destroying the major combat elements of the Iraqi Republican Guard Forces Command's elite 26th Commando Brigade.

Battle of Rumaila
Iraqi Republican Guard forces were engaged within the Hammar Marshes of the Tigris–Euphrates river system in Iraq while attempting to reach and cross the Lake Hammar causeway and escape northward toward Baghdad on Highway 8. Most of the -long Iraqi caravan of several hundred vehicles was first boxed into a kill zone and then in the course of the next five hours systematically devastated by the U.S. 24th Infantry Division, including its armored forces, by AH-64 Apache attack helicopters, and nine artillery battalions. Nine American artillery battalions would fire thousands of rounds and rockets during this particular engagement. At least six Hammurabi Republican Guard battalions were destroyed.

The 1st Battalion, 24th Aviation Regiment destroyed 32 Iraqi tanks, 49 BMPs, 37 trucks, 8 Frog missile launchers, numerous other assorted artillery pieces, anti-aircraft guns, and support vehicles.
This devastating aerial attack assured the destruction of the Republican Guard Forces Hammurabi Division and the remnants of several other infantry divisions. Four companies within 1st Battalion, 24th Aviation Regiment would be awarded Valorous Unit Award citations.

General Barry McCaffrey reported the elimination of 247 tanks and armored fighting vehicles, 43 artillery pieces, and over 400 trucks. Approximately 3,000 Iraqi soldiers were captured. The battle was one-sided and Iraqi attempts to return fire proved to be almost completely ineffective, as during the engagement only one U.S. soldier was injured and two U.S. armored vehicles were lost (an M2 Bradley infantry fighting vehicle damaged by enemy fire and an M1 Abrams tank set on fire by a nearby explosion of an Iraqi truck).  A hospital bus with medics and wounded Iraqi soldiers who had already surrendered to another American platoon was also destroyed by gunfire, which later troubled many U.S. soldiers. Surviving Iraqi soldiers were either taken prisoner, fled on foot or swam to safety.

Controversy
The all-out attack on the Iraqi column, sparked by Iraqis opening fire on a U.S. patrol which had wandered into their path of retreat, took place two days after the war had been officially halted by a unilateral U.S. ceasefire and just as the Iraqi government and Coalition forces were scheduled to begin formal peace talks the next morning. These circumstances provoked a heated debate over whether McCaffrey was justified in his decision to destroy the column, and over the reason the 24th Division moved during the ceasefire into the path of the withdrawing Iraqis in the first place. U.S. Lt. Gen. Ronald H. Griffith said to investigative journalist Seymour Hersh, "It was just a bunch of tanks in a train, transported by trailer truck, and Barry McCaffrey made it a battle. He made it a battle when it was never one." McCaffrey was ultimately exonerated by an Army inquiry, however, and another one by the U.S. Congress also did not find any fault in the incident.

Summary
By the end of combat operations, the 24th Infantry Division advanced 260 miles and destroyed 360 tanks and other armored personnel carriers, 300 artillery pieces, 1,200 trucks, 25 aircraft, 19 missiles, and over 500 pieces of engineer equipment. The division took over 5,000 Iraqi prisoners of war while suffering only eight killed, 36 wounded, and five non-combat casualties. The 24th Infantry Division's Task Force Tusker would be awarded a Valorous Unit Award for its efforts.

Task Force Tusker Valorous Unit Award Citation
For extraordinary heroism while engaged in military action against Iraqi ground forces on 26 February 1991 and again on 2 March 1991. Consisting of Headquarters and Headquarters Company, Company A and Company C of the 4th Battalion, 64th Armor Regiment, Company A of the 2d Battalion, 7th Infantry Regiment, the 3d Platoon of Battery A of the 1st Battalion, 5th Air Defense Artillery Regiment, and Company A of the 5th Engineer Battalion, Task Force Tusker attacked entrenched Iraqi forces on 26 February 1991 to seize battle position 143, effectively severing the Iraqi Euphrates River Valley line of communication to the Kuwait Theater of operation and destroying the major combat elements the Republican Guards Forces Command's elite 26th Commando Brigade. Later, on 2 March 1991, while serving as the 1st Brigade's reserve force in defensive positions astride Highway 8, east of Basra, Task Force Tusker attacked into the enemy formations, and in doing so, completed the destruction of the Hammurabi Division and the remnants of several other Republican Guards Forces Command Divisions. Task Force Tuskers extraordinary gallantry and valor in two key combat actions contributed significantly to the success of the 24th Infantry Division's offensive operations in Iraq.

Task Force Tusker Units Cited
Headquarters and Headquarters Company, 4th Battalion, 64th Armor Regiment (HHC, 4-64th AR)
3rd Platoon, Battery A, 1st Battalion, 5th Air Defense Artillery Regiment
Company A, 2nd Battalion, 7th Infantry Regiment (Team B)
Company A, 4th Battalion, 64th Armor Regiment (Team A)
Company A, 5th Engineer Battalion
Company C, 3rd Battalion, 7th Infantry Regiment (Team D)
Company C, 4th Battalion, 64th Armor Regiment (Team C)
Fire Support Teams, 1st Battalion, 41st Field Artillery Regiment
Tactical Air Control Party, Detachment 3, 507th Tactical Air Control Wing, U.S. Air Force

1st Battalion, 24th Aviation Regiment Valorous Unit Award Citation
For extraordinary heroism while engaged in military action against Iraqi ground forces in the Rumayiah oil fields on 2 March 1991. Consisting of Headquarters and service Company, and Companies A, B, C, D, the attack Battalion responded with swiftness and determination to reports that a large armored enemy force was approaching the 24th Infantry Division's security zone from the east. Quickly coordinating an engagement area with the responsible ground Commander, the attack battalion established a battle position to the northwest of the oil fields, effectively cutting the enemy's escape route across the Hammar Causeway. Rotating attack helicopter companies into the battle position, enemy forces were engaged with 30mm cannon fire, 2.75 inch rockets, and Hellfire missiles. This devastating application of firepower set the conditions for a swift and decisive counterattack by armored ground forces. During the ground counterattack, the attack helicopters, in conjunction with a small ground element, protected the southeastern flank of the counterattack force by sealing the battlefield from other Iraqi forces in the area. Within hours, the attack battalion destroyed 32 Iraqi tanks, 49 BMPs, 37 trucks, 8 Frog Missile launchers, numerous other assorted artillery pieces, anti-aircraft guns, and support vehicles. This devastating aerial attack assured the destruction of the Republican Guard Forces Hammurabi Division and the remnants of several other infantry divisions.

1st Battalion, 24th Aviation Regiment Units Cited
Headquarters Service Company, 1st Battalion, 24th Aviation Regiment
Company A, 1st Battalion, 24th Aviation Regiment
Company B, 1st Battalion 24th Aviation Regiment
Company C, 1st Battalion, 24th Aviation Regiment
Company D, 1st Battalion, 24th Aviation Regiment

See also 
 Highway of Death

References

Sources

External links
 David S. Pierson, Battle at Rumaila, Military Magazine, 2011.

1991 in Iraq
Rumaila
Rumaila
Rumaila
March 1991 events in Asia